Seyidlikəndyeri (also, Seyidlikendyeri) is a village and municipality in the Khachmaz District of Azerbaijan. It has a population of 1,262. The municipality consists of the villages of Seyidlikendyeri, Aslanoba, Ashaghyoba, Khuray, and Sahiller.

References 

Populated places in Khachmaz District